Pirou is a commune in the Manche department in Normandy in north-western France. It is around 50 km south of Cherbourg and 90 km west of Caen. The inhabitants are called Pirouais.

Heraldry

See also
 Communes of the Manche department
 Château de Pirou
 Wild at art - photo log of the famous graffiti in the abandoned village

References

Communes of Manche